Polina Petrovna Smolova (born 3 September 1980) is a Belarusian pop singer and the Belarusian entry for the Eurovision Song Contest 2006 with the song Mum, with which she took part in the Eurovision semi-final. She performed 5th in the running order but failed to qualify for the final placing 22nd out of 23 accumulating a total of 10 points.

Biography
Polina Smolova started her singing career in the children folk bands. In 2012, Polina attempted to represent Russia at the Eurovision Song Contest 2012 with the song "Michael" about Michael Jackson. She placed seventh in the Russian national selection.

On November 11, 2017, she gave birth to a little boy.

External links
Polina's official site with music downloads

1980 births
Living people
Musicians from Minsk
21st-century Belarusian women singers
Eurovision Song Contest entrants for Belarus
Eurovision Song Contest entrants of 2006
Slavianski Bazaar winners